Bernard Smith (c. 1522 – 1591) of Totnes in Devon was MP for Totnes in 1558. He was mayor of  Totnes in 1549–50 and c. 1565–6, and was escheator of  Devon and Cornwall in 1567–8.

Origins
He was the son of Walter Smith (d.1555), a merchant of Totnes,  whose Easter Sepulchre type monument survives in the south chancel aisle of St Mary's Church, Totnes. At the Dissolution of the Monasteries Walter had purchased Totnes Priory and some of its lands which in 1544 he conveyed to feoffees for the uses of himself and his son Bernard. Bernard's sister Alice Smith was the wife firstly of John Hurst (d. 1555) (son of William Hurst (d. 1568), merchant of Exeter, thrice MP for Exeter) and secondly of John II Petre (d. 1581) of Exeter and Bowhay, MP for Exeter in 1554 and  governor of the Exeter Merchant Adventurers.

Career
One of the earliest surviving recorded events of his career was his seizure in 1545 of a Spanish ship and its cargo which resulted in his censure by the Privy Council and an order for him to restore   both to their owner. In several ventures he was a business partner of Christoper Savery MP and his brother Richard Savery MP, whom he later accused in the Star Chamber of assault and theft.

Lands held

Marriage and progeny
The name of Bernard Smith's wife, whom he had married by 1547,  is not known, but by her he left a daughter and sole heiress:

Eleanor Smith, a substantial heiress who married four times, but produced no issue:
Firstly to John Charles (1543–68) of Tavistock, whose great-great-grandfather John Charles of Morton Hampstead in Devon had married Margery Foorde, daughter and heiress of Richard Foorde long seated at the estate of Foorde in the parish of Moretonhampstead, which estate had been given to his ancestor Ely (or Elias) Foorde by William de Mandeville, 3rd Earl of Essex (d. 1189). Without issue.
Secondly on 30 January 1569/70 at Totnes Eleanor married, as his 2nd wife, Sir John Fulford (1524-1580) of Great Fulford, Dunsford, Devon, Sheriff of Devon in 1557 and 1576. Without issue.
Thirdly Eleanor married John II Wrey (d.pre 1596) of North Russell in Devon and Trebeigh, St Ive, in Cornwall, eldest son of John I Wrey (d.1597), Sheriff of Cornwall in 1587, and brother of Sir William Wrey, 1st Baronet (d.1636). The large chest tomb monument to John Wrey I showing kneeling effigies of him and his wife Blanche Killigrew (d.1595), heiress of Trebeigh, survives in the north transept of St Peter's Church in Tawstock, Devon, a later seat of the Wrey family, having been removed in 1924 from St Ive Church in Cornwall. The arms of Smith of Totnes Barry undé of sixteen argent and azure, on a chief gules three barnacles or are shown on the front of the chest tomb impaled by Wrey. Without issue.
Fourthly in 1596 Eleanor married Ambrose Bellot (c. 1561–1637) of Bochym, Cornwall and of "Downton", Devon   MP for East Looe , Cornwall, in 1597.

Death and succession
Bernard Smith died in Totnes on 16 July 1591. He was succeeded by his daughter and sole heiress Eleanor Smith, then the wife of  John Wrey. His will has not survived.

Sources
  Hawkyard, A.D.K., biography of Bernard Smith published in  History of Parliament: the House of Commons 1509-1558, ed. S.T. Bindoff, 1982

References

1522 births
1591 deaths
Members of the Parliament of England (pre-1707) for Totnes
English MPs 1558
Escheators